Otto Schlefenberg (1917-1991) was an Austrian-Israeli footballer and manager. He is best known for his years at Maccabi Haifa where he started his managerial career.

Playing career
Born in Austria, Schlefenberg played in Hakoah Vienna before moving to Mandatory Palestine, where he joined Maccabi Haifa, for whom he made his debut in 4 May 1940, in a Liga Bet match against Maccabi Binyamina. In 1950, Schlefenberg withdrew from active play.

Coaching career
Schalfenberg re-arranged Maccabi Haifa's youth team, Maccabi Shlomo Haifa, and coached it for two years before being appointed as head coach for the club in 1952, a post he held for the next two years, promoting many of the youth team's players, such as Jonny Hardy and Avraham Menchel to the senior side.

After leaving Maccabi Haifa, Schlefenberg coached Hapoel Tiberias, Maccabi Hadera and Maccabi Pardes Hanna. In 1962 Schlefenberg returned to Maccabi Haifa, as a replacement for coach Alex Forbes and led the club to winning its first major trophy, the State Cup.

Schlefenberg resigned from coaching Maccabi Haifa in February 1963, and later coached Hakoah Ramat Gan, Hapoel Ashkelon, Maccabi Netanya, Hapoel MahaneYehuda, Hapoel Sderot and Hapoel Kiryat Malakhi.

Honours

Player
Liga Bet (second tier):
1946–47

Coach
Israel State Cup:
1961–62
Israel Super Cup:
1962 (shared)
Liga Bet (third tier):
1963–64 (with Hapoel Ashkelon)
1966–68 (with Hapoel Sderot)

References

External links 
  Profile and biography of Otto Schlefenberg on Maccabi Haifa's official website

1991 deaths
Austrian Jews
20th-century Israeli Jews
Jewish footballers
Austrian footballers
Israeli footballers
Israeli people of Austrian-Jewish descent
SC Hakoah Wien footballers
Maccabi Haifa F.C. players
Maccabi Haifa F.C. managers
Hapoel Ashkelon F.C. managers
Hakoah Maccabi Ramat Gan F.C. managers
Maccabi Netanya F.C. managers
Hapoel Mahane Yehuda F.C. managers
Association football midfielders
1917 births
Austrian football managers
Austrian emigrants to Mandatory Palestine